Longcliffe railway station was a minor railway station on the Cromford and High Peak Railway. Near Longcliffe, Derbyshire. Opened in 1855 and closed in 1876. Nothing remains of the former station.

Route

References 

Railway stations in Derbyshire
1855 establishments in England
Derbyshire